Cincinnati Hills Christian Academy (CHCA) is a private, PK2 – Grade 12, college preparatory, non-denominational Christian school located on four campuses in Cincinnati, Ohio. Three of its campuses (Edyth B. Lindner Campus, Founders' Campus, and Martha S. Lindner Campus) are located in northern Cincinnati, in Sycamore Township and Symmes Township, near the intersection of Interstate 71 and Interstate 275. The Otto Armleder Memorial Education Center is located in downtown Cincinnati.

History

Overview
The school was founded, in large part by Cincinnati businessman Carl Lindner, Jr., in 1989 on a  plot of land. In its first year, it enrolled 165 students in pre-kindergarten through seventh grade. It has since expanded to an Early Learning Program for PK2-PK4, a Lower School for grades KPrep – 6, and the city's only Christ-centered six-year college prep upper school experience for grades 7–12. The downtown campus is home to students preschool age 3 – Grade 6. CHCA has an enrollment of approx. 1300 students in 2021.

Edyth B. Lindner Campus
The construction of the Edyth B. Lindner Elementary School adjacent to the original campus building took place in 1992. This elementary school originally housed preschool through Grade 3. This campus is now home to the Blake Lindner Thompson Early Childhood Learning Center for preschool students ages 2–4, and the Lower School Grades KPrep – 3.

Founders' Campus 
This original CHCA campus building is now home to CHCA's Lower School Grades 4–6 Upper Elementary Program, as well as Upper School Grades 7–8, the early years of CHCA's six-year college prep experience.

Martha S. Lindner Campus 
In 2001, this high school was constructed on a nearby  plot of land. In 2008, a $3 million addition to the high school began. It was completed in January 2009.  In 2016–2017, the school was expanded once more.  It is home to CHCA's Upper School students Grades 9–12.

Otto Armleder Memorial Education Center
The school system purchased the historic Crosley Square Building in downtown Cincinnati to establish a school for inner-city students from pre-kindergarten to sixth grade. In March 2006, Lindner announced a $16 million gift to the school, which would allow the Armleder Center to add seventh and eighth grades to its kindergarten through sixth grade offerings, and would also fund scholarships for some Armleder students to continue their college-prep education through Upper School in Symmes Township.  The school is now home to students in preschool ages 3–4 through Grade 6.

Athletics
The Eagles are a member of the Miami Valley Conference.

OHSAA State Championships
 Boys' Baseball – 2021

Notable alumni
Katie Reider, singer-songwriter
Nicholas Petricca, lead singer of Walk the Moon

References

Christian schools in Ohio
Private schools in Cincinnati
Preparatory schools in Ohio
High schools in Hamilton County, Ohio
Educational institutions established in 1989
Private high schools in Ohio
Private middle schools in Ohio
Private elementary schools in Ohio
Lindner family
1989 establishments in Ohio